The Justice Alliance was one of the largest factions of the Democratic Progressive Party, founded in 1991 by Chen Shui-bian. Other members included Hsu Tain-tsair, Annette Lu, and Su Huan-chih. All DPP factions were officially dissolved in 2006.

References

See also 
 Politics of Taiwan

Democratic Progressive Party
Political organizations based in Taiwan
1991 establishments in Taiwan
2006 disestablishments in Taiwan